The 1928 United States House of Representatives elections in Virginia were held on November 6, 1928 to determine who will represent the Commonwealth of Virginia in the United States House of Representatives. Virginia had ten seats in the House, apportioned according to the 1920 United States Census. Representatives are elected for two-year terms.

Overview

References

See also
 United States House elections, 1928

Virginia
1928
1928 Virginia elections